BS9 may refer to:
BS9, a BS postcode area for Bristol, England
Bonomi BS.9 Bertina, a glider
BS 9 Specification and Sections of Bull Head Railway Rails, a British Standard